This is the list of notable stars in the constellation Crux, sorted by decreasing brightness.

See also
 List of star names in Crux
 List of stars by constellation
 Bandeira do Brasil: Sobre as estrelas (Portuguese)

Notes

References

List
Crux